Sant Julià, Catalan for Saint Julian, may refer to:

Places
Andorra
Sant Julià de Lòria, parish in Andorra

Spain
Sant Julià de Cerdanyola, town and municipality in the comarca of Berguedà
Sant Julià de Ramis, village in the province of Girona
Sant Julià de Vilatorta, municipality in the comarca of Osona
Sant Julià del Llor i Bonmatí, municipality in the comarca of la Selva

Sports
 UE Sant Julià, football club in Andorra